Songs for Little Kids is the second studio and first children's music album by Australian musician Peter Combe. It was released in 1982 and certified gold in Australia in November 1992.

Track listing
Side A
 "Spaghetti Bolognaise" - 2:27	
 "Jennifer Wicks" - 2:14
 "Everybody's Got a Little Rhythm" - 1:41	
 "The Put It Song" - 0:47
 "Running On the Spot"	- 1:15
 "New Playgym"	- 2:16
 "Shake Yourself" - 1:18
 "Thelma Brown" - 3:09
 "Goldilocks and the Porridge" - 1:49	
 "George Cryolot Crumble" - 2:38
 "The Billy Goat's Gruff" - 2:17

 Side B
 "Rock 'N' Roll Is All You Need" - 2:30
 "Arms Were Made to Hug and Squeeze" - 1:38
 "Peppercorn Tree" - 0:38
 "Goldilocks Goldilocks" - 2:29
 "Oscar and Mr Hairy Gorilla" - 0:30
 "The Mixed Up Song" - 0:20
 "Red Train" - 0:45
 "Green, Red and Yellow" - 0:55
 "Kangaroo, Kangaroo" - 2:23
 "Old Wheelbarrow - 1:08
 "Up and Down" - 2:10

All songs composed, arranged and produced by Peter Combe.

Certifications

Release history

References

1982 albums
Peter Combe albums